Keshar-e Sargap (also Romanized as Keshār-e Sargap; also known as Keshr-e Sargab) is a village in Kohurestan Rural District, in the Central District of Khamir County, Hormozgan Province, Iran. At the 2006 census, its population was 417, in 105 families.

References 

Populated places in Khamir County